River Horse is the literal English translation of the Greek word Hippopotamus (ἱπποπόταμος). Other uses include:

 River Horse (sculpture), a sculpture at George Washington University
 River Horse Brewery, a brewery in New Jersey
 River-Horse, a 1999 book by William Least Heat-Moon